Schwändi, Schwaendi or Schwandi may refer to:

 Schwandi, Bern, a village in the Swiss canton of Bern
 Schwändi, near Elm, Glarus, a hamlet located near the village of Elm in the Swiss canton of Glarus
 Schwändi, near Schwanden, Glarus, a village and former municipality located near the village of Schwanden in the Swiss canton of Glarus